Hormozabad may refer to:
 Hormozabad, Isfahan
 Hormozabad, Semirom, Isfahan Province
 Hormozabad, Kerman
 Hormozabad, West Azerbaijan